Fernando Pereira (1950–1985) was a Dutch photographer.

Fernando Pereira may also refer to:
 Fernando Pereira (engineer) (1930-2018), Spanish engineer and professor
 Fernando Pereira (major) (born 1963), major in the military of São Tomé and Príncipe
 Fernando Pereira, co-founder of Naked News
 Fernando Pereira (Angolan footballer) (born 1973), Angolan footballer
 Fernando Pereira (Venezuelan footballer) (born 1959), Venezuelan footballer
 Fernando Pereira (computer scientist), distinguished researcher at Google
 Fernando Pereira (Portuguese footballer) (born 1968), Portuguese football player and coach
 Fernando Pereira Kosec, Uruguayan politician